The 2013 Tashkent Challenger was a professional tennis tournament played on hard courts. It was the sixth edition of the tournament which was part of the 2013 ATP Challenger Tour. It took place in Tashkent, Uzbekistan between 7 and 13 October 2013.

Singles main-draw entrants

Seeds

 1 Rankings are as of September 30, 2013.

Other entrants
The following players received wildcards into the singles main draw:
  Sanjar Fayziev
  Temur Ismailov
  Djurabeck Karimov
  Shonigmatjon Shofayziyev

The following players received entry from the qualifying draw:
  Sarvar Ikramov
  Lim Yong-Kyu
  Lucas Pouille
  Danai Udomchoke

Champions

Singles

 Dudi Sela def.  Teymuraz Gabashvili 6–1, 6–2

Doubles

 Mikhail Elgin /  Teymuraz Gabashvili def.  Purav Raja /  Divij Sharan 6–4, 6–4

External links
Official Website

Tashkent Challenger
Tashkent Challenger